Aeral (contraction of AERonautica ALessandrina) is a defunct private Italian airline, which used ex-Alitalia Douglas DC-8s.
It was founded in March 1958 at Alessandria in southern Piedmont by Maria Luisa Bottanelli, and later moved its operational base at Milan Malpensa airport. The company initially concentrated on air taxi work using a fleet of Cessna 421 aircraft, but in 1978, the company's twentieth year of operations, a new activity was introduced, that of international charter freight transportation with a four-engined Douglas DC-8/54. A second aircraft of the type leased from Overseas National Airways, was introduced in December 1979. Cargo flights started on 17 February 1979. Facing financial difficulties, Aeral ceased all activity on August 31, 1980.

Fleet

See also
 List of defunct airlines of Italy

References

External links
Photo of an Aeral DC-8
Aeral DC at Malpensa International Airport in 1980

Italian companies established in 1958
1981 disestablishments in Italy
Defunct airlines of Italy
Airlines established in 1958
Airlines disestablished in 1980